Liew Thow Lin (31 March 1930 - 9 April 2013) of Malaysia was known as the "Magnet Man",, "Magnetic Man" or "Mr. Magnet" because he had the ability to stick metal objects to his body.

Liew performed in many charity events showing his ability. He could cause metal objects, weighing up to  each, up to 36 kg total, to stick to his skin. He also pulled a car using this ability.

Liew's ability was not due to any source of magnetism. Scientists from Malaysia's University of Technology found no magnetic field in Lin's body, but did determine that his skin exhibits very high levels of friction, providing a "suction effect". The trait appears to be genetic, appearing in Lin's three grandchildren. 
Liew was featured on the second episode of the Discovery Channel's One Step Beyond.

See also
Human magnetism

References

Malaysian people of Chinese descent
Malaysian entertainers
1930 births
2013 deaths